The Quesnell Bridge is a girder bridge that spans the North Saskatchewan River in Edmonton, Alberta, Canada.  It is part of Edmonton's southern freeway,  Whitemud Drive. An average of 120,000 cars pass over the bridge every day.

Construction
In 2008, the city announced a project to widen the bridge, Whitemud Drive, and Fox Drive, adding capacity projected to be sufficient until 2058. It was completed in September 2011. They were believed to be fossils from two extinct genera, Edmontosaurus and Albertosaurus.

Quesnell Bridge connects the communities of Brookside/Brander Gardens on the south end to Quesnell Heights/Laurier Heights on the north end.

See also 
 List of crossings of the North Saskatchewan River
 List of bridges in Canada

References

External links
Current Road Projects

Bridges in Edmonton
Road bridges in Alberta